Enjoy the Ride is the second studio album by American country music duo Sugarland, released on November 7, 2006 on Mercury Nashville Records. The album is the first one released with Sugarland as a duo (comprising Jennifer Nettles and Kristian Bush), as former member Kristen Hall had departed earlier in 2006.

The album debuted at No. 4 on the US Billboard 200 and at No. 2 on the US Country Album Chart, selling 211,000 copies in its first week; these were also its peak positions on the two charts. The album is certified 3× platinum by the RIAA for shipments of 3 million copies.

The album produced four chart singles on the Billboard Hot Country Songs charts, all of which were Top Ten hits. "Want To" and "Settlin'" (respectively the first and second singles) were both Number One hits, with the former being their first U.S. Number One. "Everyday America", the third single, was a No. 9 on the country charts and was used on the TV series Good Morning America. The final single was the acoustic ballad "Stay", which peaked at No. 2.

Track listing

A music video was made for "These Are the Days" even though it was not released as a single. The video is available on the iTunes Store.

Personnel

Sugarland
Kristian Bush – acoustic guitar; background vocals (except 9, 10); mandolin (2, 3, 4, 6, 7, 11); electric guitar (2, 5); second lead vocals (6)
Jennifer Nettles – lead vocals; background vocals (1, 2, 3, 8); acoustic guitar (3)

Additional personnel
Thad Beaty – electric guitar (4)
Mike Brignardello – bass guitar (6)
Tom Bukovac – electric guitar, synthesizer
Brandon Bush – organ (3, 4, 10); clavinet, drum loops, percussion (4)
Paul Bushnell – bass guitar (2, 5, 9, 11)
Annie Clements – bass guitar (4); background vocals (4, 7)
Dan Dugmore – electric guitar (1, 7);  steel guitar (1, 2, 5, 8, 9, 11); Dobro (3, 8); acoustic guitar (6)
Shannon Forrest – drums, percussion (6, 11); cymbals (2)
Kenny Greenberg – electric guitar (1, 3, 6, 7, 8, 11)
Rob Hajacos – fiddle (2, 8)
Tony Harrell – organ (1-3, 5, 7-9, 11); accordion (2, 7, 8); Mellotron (3, 6); piano (5, 6); synthesizer (5, 6); harmonium (8)
Jarrod Johnson – drums (4)
Tim Lauer – accordion (2)
Greg Morrow – drums, percussion (1–3, 5, 7–9); drum loops (9)
Brad Paisley – electric guitar (track 9)
Scott Patton – electric guitar (4)
Glenn Worf – bass guitar (1, 3, 7, 8)

Chart performance

Weekly charts

Year-end charts

Certifications

References

2006 albums
Mercury Nashville albums
Sugarland albums
Albums produced by Byron Gallimore